Boy and the World is a 2013 Brazilian animated adventure film written and directed by Alê Abreu. It was nominated at the 88th Academy Awards for Best Animated Feature. The film was created using a mix of both drawing and painting and digital animation.

Plot 

Cuca lives a very simple and blissful life with his parents. He spends his days playing in the forest, interacting with the animals, and listening to various sounds (represented by glowing balls of light). One day, Cuca's father leaves by train to find work, saddening Cuca with the nostalgia of playing with his mom and dad. Feeling that he will never be happy again, Cuca leaves with a large suitcase that contains only a picture of him and his parents. While waiting for the train, a sudden gust of wind lifts him up and carries him far away to a world that appears to have two moons.

Cuca is rescued by an old man and his pet dog, who promptly take him to work alongside them in the cotton fields. While there, Cuca hears the music of a traveling parade led by a young man in a rainbow poncho. The foreman of the cotton fields goes over his workers, and fires those who are unable due to advanced age or sickness. Cuca, the old man, and the dog travel many nights through the countryside before stopping under a large pink-leaved tree. In the distance, Cuca spots his father traveling on the back of a truck. He leaves the suitcase to the old man and follows the main road.

He arrives at a factory where the workers churn the cotton into fabric in robotic unison. At the end of the day, Cuca takes a bus into a grimy city and ends up staying with a young factory worker who is later revealed to be the rainbow poncho-wearing leader of the parade. In the morning, Cuca and the young man arrive at the market where the young man busks as a street musician to earn more money. While playing with a kaleidoscope, Cuca ends up on a barge where he learns that the fabrics are taken to a futuristic utopian city floating above the ocean. The fabrics are turned into clothing and repackaged out of sight in the city's dark underbelly, before being shipped back and sold in the grimy city. He reunites with the young man and the two sneak into the factory where the young man makes a rainbow poncho. They witness the factory's manager make a deal with a strange business man to replace the workers with a large automated machine. The young man and the rest of the workers are fired but a truck arrives to take them to work in the cotton fields.

While making their way back to the city, Cuca and the young man are stopped in traffic by the parade. Cuca suddenly spots the train his father came on and, using the young man's bike, arrives at the station to greet his father. However, Cuca is shocked to see multiple fathers who all look the same and all came to the city for a similar purpose. The parade is forcefully stopped by the city's army (represented by a giant, rainbow bird being defeated in combat by a militaristic black bird) and parts of the city lie in ruin. Cuca witnesses young children in the slums arming themselves with primitive weapons and preparing to start a rebellion. The young man looks on from a hill made of trash.

Cuca runs back home where he witnesses various machines taking over the countryside (inter-cut with live-action footage of deforestations and heavy carbon dioxide emissions). He arrives back at the pink-leaved tree where it is revealed that the old man is actually an older Cuca and that the tree is outside his now dilapidated childhood home. In a flashback, the young man, who is also Cuca, is seen leaving home and saying goodbye to his mother while seeing a pink-leaved sapling. Old Cuca pins the photo of him and his family to a wall and dons the rainbow poncho. He looks out and finds that his abandoned childhood home is surrounded by newer houses and farmers whose children continue to play and sing songs. The movie ends with one final flashback of Cuca and his parents planting the seed that will become the pink-leaved tree as the screen fades to white.

Cast 
 Vinicius Garcia as Cuca (Menino)
 Felipe Zilse as Young Man (Jovem) / Additional voices
 Alê Abreu as Old Man (Velho)
 Lu Horta as Cuca's mother (Mãe)
 Marco Aurélio Campos as Cuca's father (Pai)
 Cassius Romero as Dog (Cachorro)

Reception 
Boy and the World received critical acclaim. The film holds a 93% on Rotten Tomatoes with a 7.8/10 average rating based on 57 reviews. The consensus reads, "Boy and the Worlds distinctive animation is visually thrilling – and it's backed up with a daring, refreshingly different storyline that should enthrall younger viewers while resonating deeply with adults." Metacritic, which uses a weighted average, assigned the film a score of 80/100 based on 18 critics."

The film's worldwide premiere occurred at the Ottawa International Animation Festival where it won an Honourable Mention for Best Animated Feature "Because it was full of some of the most beautiful images we've ever seen". It also earned an honorable mention at the Festival do Rio and won the Youth Award at the Mostra de Cinema de São Paulo. At the Festival de Cinema de Animação de Lisboa, it won the Best Film Award. At the Annecy International Animated Film Festival, it won the Cristal Award for Best Feature Film, and was voted the favorite film by the audience. In 2015, at Animafest Zagreb, the film won the Grand Prix for feature film. The jury stated that they have awarded the film because it uses innovative artwork, combines both political and emotional feelings, that took them on a colorful trip. In 2016, Boy and the World won the 43rd Annie Awards for Best Animated Feature-Independent.

Television series 
In 2016, it was announced that a spin-off series titled Menino and the Children of the World had entered development. The educational series combines animation with live action footage and features the character of Cuca and his dog traveling to various countries of the world and learning about their culture through the eyes of children. As of 2022, there is no planned release date.

See also
 Cinema of Brazil
 Tito and the Birds
 Rio - 2011 animated film
 Rio 2096: A Story of Love and Fury

References

External links 
  
 

Annie Award winners
Animated films without speech
Brazilian animated films
Brazilian children's films
Films directed by Alê Abreu
2013 animated films
2013 films
Anifilm award winners
Annecy Cristal for a Feature Film winners
Animated feature films